Clepsis griseotona is a species of moth of the family Tortricidae. It is found in Santa Catarina, Brazil.

The wingspan is 14–17 mm. The ground colour of the forewings is grey, but whiter dorsally. The strigulation (fine streaking) is dark grey and the markings are grey strigulated with dark grey. The hindwings are greyish cream, with grey strigulation.

Etymology
The species name refers to the colouration of the forewings and is derived from Latin griseus (meaning grey) and tonus (meaning tone, shade).

References

Moths described in 2010
Clepsis